Verda Mae Freeman Welcome (18 March 1907 – 22 April 1990) was an American teacher, civil rights leader, and Maryland state senator. Welcome was the second black woman to be elected to a state senate in the U.S. (Cora Mae Brown was the first in 1952). She spent 25 years in the Maryland legislature and worked to pass legislation which enforced stricter employment regulations and discouraged racial discrimination.

Early life and education
Born as Verda Mae Freeman, one of sixteen children of John Nuborn and Ella Theodocia Freeman, Verda Welcome was born on a small farm in Lake Lure (previously known as Uree), North Carolina. In 1929, she moved to Baltimore, and graduated from Coppin State Teachers College three years later. She married Dr. Henry C. Welcome in 1935. She received a bachelor's degree in history from Morgan State College in 1939, and completed a master's degree in history at New York University in 1943. Between 1934 and 1945, Welcome taught at public schools in Baltimore. She was a member of Delta Sigma Theta sorority.

Politics
In 1958, Welcome was elected to the Maryland House of Delegates to represent the Fourth District of Baltimore City, becoming the first black woman to hold the position, which she held for three years. Elected to the Maryland State Senate in 1962, she was the second black woman in the United States to be elected to hold a state senate seat. In April 1964, Welcome survived an assassination attempt; two men were convicted. In 1967, Welcome worked towards eliminating Maryland's racial segregation laws which had been in place since slavery was legal.

Welcome was a delegate to the Democratic National Convention in 1968, 1972, and 1976. She served in political office until 1982, when she retired. Welcome died on 22 April 1990 in Baltimore.

Other accomplishments
Welcome was awarded a Woman of the Year award in 1962, which was presented by the Women's Auxiliary to the National Medical Association. In 1988, she was inducted into the Maryland Women's Hall of Fame.

Bibliography 
 Maryland General Assembly, Verda Freeman Welcome: A Person of Principle, 1991. 
 Welcome, Verda F., My Life and Times: Verda F. Welcome As Told to James M. Abraham. Englewood Cliffs, NJ : Henry House Publishers, Inc., 1991.

References

External links
Archives of Maryland (Biographical Series) - Verda Freeman Welcome
Archives of Maryland Online - Verda Freeman Welcome - List of accomplishments
Thinkquest - Verda Freeman Welcome
Verda Welcome: 1st African-American State Senator - Ghosts of Baltimore blog

1907 births
1990 deaths
People from Lake Lure, North Carolina
African-American state legislators in Maryland
African-American women in politics
Schoolteachers from Maryland
20th-century American women educators
American civil rights activists
Democratic Party Maryland state senators
Democratic Party members of the Maryland House of Delegates
Morgan State University alumni
New York University alumni
Women state legislators in Maryland
20th-century American women politicians
20th-century American educators
Activists from Maryland
20th-century African-American women
20th-century African-American politicians
20th-century American politicians